The 1999 Kentucky gubernatorial election took place on November 2, 1999, for the post of Governor of Kentucky. Democratic incumbent Governor Paul E. Patton defeated Republican nominee Peppy Martin to win a second term. It was the first time that the election was held since the Kentucky General Assembly changed its term limits law in 1992, allowing Patton to run again and leaving Virginia as the only state that prohibits its Governor from serving immediate successive terms.

Democratic primary

Candidates
 Paul E. Patton, incumbent Governor

Results

Republican primary

Candidates
 Peppy Martin, perennial candidate
 David Lynn Williams, perennial candidate

Results

General election

Results

References

1999
Gubernatorial
Kentucky